"Beautiful War"  is a song by American rock band Kings of Leon. The song was released as a digital download on December 9, 2013 through RCA Records as the fourth single from their sixth studio album Mechanical Bull (2013). The song was written by Caleb Followill, Nathan Followill, Jared Followill and Matthew Followill. The song is first demoed to other music artists such as Christina Aguilera, Kelly Clarkson and Westlife.

Music video
A music video to accompany the release of "Beautiful War" was first released onto YouTube on November 22, 2013 at a total length of six minutes and thirty-five seconds. Garrett Hedlund pays homage to a fallen Cowboy whose name is Lane Frost. Also, the County in which the character is incarcerated is Lane Co.

Track listing

Chart performance

Weekly charts

References

2013 songs
2013 singles
Kings of Leon songs
Rock ballads
RCA Records singles
Songs written by Caleb Followill
Songs written by Jared Followill
Songs written by Matthew Followill
Songs written by Nathan Followill